The Guard Battalion (Estonian: Vahipataljon) is specialized unit under the Military Police of the Estonian Defence Forces, which conducts ceremonial duties and prepares military police units. It is based in Tallinn and specialized in urban warfare.

Being the capital's largest military formation, the Guard Battalion also has the duty of carrying the watch over the presidential palace and welcoming foreign diplomats and political guests.

History

1919-1940 
The Guard Battalion was first created on 9 January 1919 from a battalion of the Estonian Defense League. It served as an auxiliary law enforcement unit in Tallinn that doubled as a ceremonial unit used at funerals and reception ceremonies for foreign guests. On 25 February, it was officially renamed to the Guard Battalion. On 1 June of the following year it was renamed to the Tallinn Single Guard Battalion. On 20 May 1939, by order of President Konstantin Päts, 11 January 1928 was declared to be the birthday of the unit. On 1 July 1930, the Tallinn Garrison Command and Guard Battalion were formed as an independent institution. On 19 April 1940, the battalion was approved a unit flag donated by the Bank of Estonia. After the Soviet invasion of Estonia, the unit was moved out of its barracks and phased into the 21st Rifle Regiment.

Since 1993 
The modern Guard Battalion was reestablished on 22 January 1993 on the basis of the formerly Internal Defense Guard Regiment, which was previously engaged in incarceration services. On 1 May 2003, a battalion known as the Single Guard was renamed the Infantry Training Center before being changed at the outset of 2009 to the Guard Battalion. Since 2014, it has been subordinated to the Sõjaväepolitsei, being part of the Northern Defense District until then. In March 2015, it moved to the Estonian Navy's Mine Harbor base.

Commanders 

 Colonel Oskar Raudvere (1919–1934)
 Lieutenant Colonel Jaan Junkur (1934–1939)
 Lieutenant Colonel Juhan Tuuling (1939–1940)
 Major Jaan Ilm (1992–1994)
 Lieutenant Colonel Manivald Kasepõld (1994–1995)
 Lieutenant Colonel Vahur Väljamäe (1995–1997)
 Lieutenant Sander Kesküla (1997–1998)
 Lieutenant Colonel Riho Terras (1998–2000)
 Captain Madis Uibopuu (2000–2002)
 Major Rene Brus (2002–2007)
 Major Rasmus Lippur (2007–2009)
 Major Toomas Väli (2009–2011) 
 Lieutenant Colonel Kalle Teras (2011–2013)
 Lieutenant Colonel Kaido Sirman (2013–2015)
 Major Martin Kukk (2015–2018)
 Major Romet Kaevu (acting) (2018–2019)
 Lieutenant Colonel Margot Künnapuu (2019–present)

Unit structure

 Headquarters 
 2 Military Police Companies
 Staff and Support Center

Almost 300 conscripts are serving in the battalion every year. It is the only unit with conscripts in a military police role in the Estonian Defense Forces.

Garrison
In 2015, the battalion was moved from its old base to the base of the Estonian Navy. The old premises in suburbs of Tallinn was sold together with the old barracks of Logistics Battalion. Since then, the Guard Battalion has been in excellent living conditions for conscripts in renovated historical barracks. However, the unit has a lack of training facilities because it is far away from shooting ranges and training grounds.

Conscripts of the Estonian Navy live in the same barracks.

Notable members
Uku Suviste, representative of Estonia in the Eurovision Song Contest 2020.
Risto Lumi, a former commander of the Intelligence Department of the Headquarters of the Estonian Defence Forces.
Denis Metsavas, Russian-Estonian soldier and GRU agent convicted of treason.

Gallery

See also
 Estonian Defence Forces
 Headquarters of the Estonian Defence Forces
 Kaitseväe Orkester
 Grand Duke Gediminas Staff Battalion
 Latvian National Armed Forces Staff Battalion

References

External links

1919 establishments in Estonia
Military units and formations established in 1919
Battalions of Estonia
Organizations based in Tallinn
Guards of honour